The Software Sustainability Institute is a national facility for building better software based in the UK and founded in 2010. The Institute is based at the University of Edinburgh (EPCC formerly Edinburgh Parallel Computing Centre) with sites at the University of Manchester, the University of Oxford and the University of Southampton.

Organisation
It is an academic institute run for the benefit of researchers and software developers, and funded initially with over £4 million from Engineering and Physical Sciences Research Council (EPSRC). Further funding was provided in 2015 by EPSRC, ESRC and BBSRC with additional project funding from the Joint Information Systems Committee (JISC) and Natural Environment Research Council (NERC).

The principal investigator of the project is Neil Chue Hong with support from co-investigators Malcolm Atkinson, Les Carr, David De Roure, Carole Goble, Simon Hettrick, Caroline Jay and Mark Parsons.

See also
Research software engineering
Sustainability
The Karlskrona Manifesto

References

External links
 Third International Workshop on Requirements Engineering for Sustainable Systems
 Second International Workshop on Requirements Engineering for Sustainable Systems
 First International Workshop on Requirements Engineering for Sustainable Systems
 Software Carpentry
 First Workshop on Sustainable Software for Science: Practice and Experiences (WSSSPE'1)
 Second Workshop on Sustainable Software for Science: Practice and Experiences (WSSSPE'2)
 Sustainable Development
 Sustainable Software Development: An Agile Perspective

Engineering and Physical Sciences Research Council
Information technology organisations based in the United Kingdom
Jisc
Organizations established in 2010
Research institutes in Edinburgh
Department of Computer Science, University of Manchester
2010 establishments in the United Kingdom